Pizzica is a popular Italian folk dance, originally from the Salento peninsula in Apulia and later spreading throughout the rest of Apulia and the regions of Calabria and eastern Basilicata.

It is part of the larger family of tarantella.

Dancing the pizzica
The traditional pizzica is a couple dance. The couple need not necessarily involve two individuals of opposite sexes, and often two women can be seen dancing together. Nowadays it has become rare to see two men dancing an entire pizzica. An exception with a pizzica between two men can still be found in the town of Ostuni, where one of the two men who dance jokingly pretends to be a woman. Another exception is where two men pretend to be engaged in a duel.

The most important book about pizzica and tarantism is The Land of Remorse, written by the Italian philosopher, anthropologist and historian of religions Ernesto De Martino.

There are several traditional pizzica groups, the oldest being Officina Zoé, Uccio Aloisi gruppu, Canzoniere Grecanico Salentino, and I Tamburellisti di Torrepaduli.

Since 1998 there has been a summer Notte della Taranta (Tarantula night), consisting of a whole night where many famous musicians alternate their performances with pizzica orchestras. Some of them include Stewart Copeland, Franco Battiato, Gianna Nannini, Raiz, Lucio Dalla, and Carmen Consoli. The 11th Festival was held in Lecce in August 2008.

Notable musicians and bands
 Alessandra Belloni
 Alla Bua
 Anna Cinzia Villani
 Antonio Castrignanò
 Arakne Mediterranea
 Canzoniere Grecanico Salentino
 Mascarimirì
 Ghetonìa
 Officina Zoè
 Enza Pagliara

References

External links
 Pizzica's videos
 Pizzica's texts
 La pizzica in the 1779

Italian folk dances